Hot Girls, Bad Boys is the debut studio album by German band Bad Boys Blue released on 28 August 1985 by Coconut Records. The album includes two international hit songs "You're a Woman" and "Pretty Young Girl". The record also released three singles. The debut single, "L.O.V.E. in My Car", failed to make an impression in the pop charts, but the follow-up "You're a Woman" was a success, reaching the top 10 in many European countries and peaking at No. 1 in Israel.

Track listing
"You're a Woman" – 5:28
"I Live" – 4:52
"Pretty Young Girl" – 5:43
"L.O.V.E. in My Car" – 5:20
"Kiss You All Over, Baby" – 5:58
"Hot Girls - Bad Boys" – 4:09
"For Your Love" – 5:58
"People of the Night" – 5:00

Personnel
Credits for Hot Girls, Bad Boys adapted from liner notes.

Bad Boys Blue
Trevor Taylor – lead vocals and backing vocals (except track 4)
Andrew Thomas – lead vocals and backing vocals (track 4)
John McInerney — backing vocals

Additional personnel
Claus-Robert Kruse – synthesizers
Tony Hendrik – synthesizers and drum machine
John Parsons – electric guitar
Andreas Martin – backing vocals
Wolfgang Remling – backing vocals

Chart performance

References

External links 

 

1985 debut albums
Albums produced by Tony Hendrik
Bad Boys Blue albums
Coconut Records albums